Sushil Rajpal is an Indian director and producer. He was born and brought up in Gorakhpur, Uttar Pradesh. He is alumnus of Film and Television Institute of India (FTII) and famous for directing his National Award winning film Antardwand.

Early life
Sushil Rajpal was born and brought up in Gorakhpur [UP]. He studied at Vikas Vidyalaya, Ranchi and then at Hansraj College, Delhi. He joined the Film and Television Institute of India (FTII), Pune. He is director of National Award winner film Antardwand in which almost entire cast was from Bihar.

Career
He started his Bollywood career with the film Diksha as an Assistant Cinematographer.
Sushil Rajpal, whose directorial debut, true to life film Antardwand, received 95% of the good reviews and accolades from the industry, including a National Award. Antardwand (English translation: Inner conflict) is a 2010 Indian film co-written, produced and directed by Sushil Rajpal. The film stars Raj Singh Chaudhary and Swati Sen in the leading roles while Vinay Pathak and Akhilendra Mishra play supporting roles. The film won the National Film Award for Best Film on Social Issues at the 2009 National Awards. It had its commercial release on 27 August 2010

Filmography

References

External links
 https://www.imdb.com/name/nm3009758/

Living people
Hindi film producers
Hindi-language film directors
1952 births
Hindi film cinematographers
Film producers from Bihar
Film directors from Bihar
Cinematographers from Bihar
Producers who won the Best Film on Other Social Issues National Film Award
Directors who won the Best Film on Other Social Issues National Film Award